A large group of University of Helsinki students occupied the Old Student House on November 25, 1968. The house was the designated location of the festivities for the Student Union's centennial celebration, scheduled the day after. The action was in protest at what they saw as a 1950s style "white tie party", and an uprising against the values which this stood for. The group entered by breaking in through a French window at 17:13 local time. The happenings immediately made nationwide headlines. The action has been seen as being inspired by the May 1968 unrest in France, and other political movements around Europe in the same year, including the Spring of Prague. In 2008, Laura Kolbe, a professor of European history at the University of Helsinki and also a member of the centrist, agrarian Centre Party, described the Vanha occupation as "the ripples of the European student movement in Finland".

The dissidents' main demands concerned democratic reforms to the university's administration. However, some of the participants also demanded the founding of Marxist-Leninist study-circles in the departments and faculties, abolishing compulsory membership of the Student Union and changing the political alignment of the monthly student magazine Ylioppilaslehti. Banners carrying these proclamations were hung from the Student House's balcony and speeches were made. However, not all of the youth involved were communists; people aligned with the centrist-agrarian Centre Party participated as well.

The Student Union relocated its 100th year celebration to the Sibelius Academy, and the "Vanha occupation" was relatively short-lived. After having spent the night at the Student House, people began to dissipate the next day. By the evening the remaining occupants had cleaned up after themselves and left the building altogether. Helsinki's Swedish-language newspaper HBL wrote "people became tired and went home after having stayed up for a day, sat on the floor, drank red wine and kissed".

The generation of students and other young radicals who participated in the events have underlined the significance of the occupation as a symbolic revolt against the values of the previous generation. Indeed, many of the people involved became leading figures in Finnish politics and the financial sector, including the Social Democratic Party politicians Erkki Tuomioja, Ilkka Taipale and Ulf Sundqvist, bank manager Björn Wahlroos and diplomat Markus Lyra. However, 40 years after the events, only 36% of the Helsingin Sanomat board of selected Finnish intellectuals believed the events had any positive effect on the Finnish society.

See also
Occupation of the Student Union Building

References

1960s in Helsinki
Political history of Finland
1968 protests
November 1968 events in Europe
1968 in Finland